The United States Food and Drug Administration (FDA) Office of Criminal Investigations (OCI) provides the FDA with a specific office to conduct and coordinate its criminal investigations.

OCI special agents employ federal law enforcement methods and techniques in the investigation of suspected criminal violations of the Federal Food, Drug, and Cosmetic Act, the Federal Anti-Tampering Act, and other related federal statutes. OCI investigations concentrate on significant violations of these laws, with a priority on conduct that may present a large danger to the public health, The OCI is a relatively small agency, employing merely 180 Agents.

The FDA regulates approximately 25 cents of every dollar spent annually by Americans, the FDA is responsible for regulating products to ensure the safety of food, drugs, biological products, medical devices, cosmetics, radiation-emitting devices, and more. The law enforcement arm of the FDA, the Office of Criminal Investigations.

Pursuant to its investigative mission, OCI maintains liaison and cooperative investigative efforts with various federal, state, local, and international law enforcement agencies. OCI is designated as the Agency's point of contact with the U.S. intelligence community as it relates to the Agency's counter-terrorism mission. OCI has representation at the Interpol U.S. National Central Bureau in Washington, D.C.

History
In 1991, in the wake of the generic drug scandal, the Commissioner of Food and Drugs announced the establishment of an Office of Criminal Investigations (OCI) within the Food and Drug Administration (FDA). This newly created law enforcement office, which was created with the support and urging of FDA's Congressional Oversight Committee, would conduct and coordinate criminal investigations of violations of the Federal Food, Drug, and Cosmetic Act (FDCA), the Federal Anti-Tampering Act (FATA), other related acts, and applicable violations of Title 18 of the United States Code.

Formation
In March 1992, the formation of OCI began when FDA selected Terry Vermillion, a career federal law enforcement officer, to serve as the founding Director of this new law enforcement office. To accomplish this, OCI selected experienced and trained managers, special agents, and technical and support staff from numerous federal law enforcement agencies and from within FDA. The management staff averaged over 22 years of federal law enforcement service and the special agents averaged 12 and 1/2 years of federal law enforcement experience.

First training centre
In January 1993, OCI opened its first three field offices in Kansas City, Miami, and San Diego. The special agents hired to staff these offices received OCI and FDA specific training tailored expressly toward FDA's many areas of responsibility using the facilities located at the Federal Law Enforcement Training Center (FLETC). While the agents were attending training at FLETC, OCI was required to become operational in response to reports that several consumers across the nation were claiming they had found syringes in Diet Pepsi products. OCI deployed agents from the FLETC training course to lead the investigation of this nationwide tampering scare. The United States Attorney's offices recognized the serious ramifications of people making false tampering reports and provided their support for the OCI investigation. The resulting outcome of the investigation and the arrests of those making false tampering claims put a stop to the rash of tampering reports. In the end, over 60 individuals were successfully prosecuted for violation of the FATA.

Opening of offices
In the summer of 1993, OCI opened three more offices in Chicago, New York and Metropolitan Washington, D.C. Since opening six field offices in 1993, six resident offices and 26 domicile offices have become operational throughout the United States and Puerto Rico.

Regulation
The FDA regulates approximately 25 cents of every dollar spent annually by American consumers. FDA is responsible for regulating products to ensure the safety of foods, prescription and over-the-counter drugs, biological products such as vaccines and blood, medical devices, cosmetics, radiation-emitting products, and more.

Misconduct allegations
The agency has come under scrutiny on multiple occasions. In 2010, director Terry Vermillion stepped down after allegations surfaced that he had abused his power. In 2016, the agency was subject to scrutiny once again after Reuters news agency reported in a series of articles that the agency, under its new director George Karavetsos, had been potentially wasting resources by pursuing cases that lacked prosecutorial merit, often targeting legitimate drugs labelled for foreign countries and claiming that they were mislabelled.

According to Reuters, critics have argued that many of these cases posed little threat to public health and that many cases failed to show any clear signs of criminal intention on the part of the alleged perpetrators. Furthermore, evidence surfaced of agents acting in a threatening and aggressive manner. Shortly after Reuters published these articles, the House Committee on Energy and Commerce launched a review of the agency. The following January, under circumstances reminiscent of Vermillion's resignation in 2010, Karavetsos stepped down, not disclosing his reasons for doing so.

Jurisdiction
Federal Food, Drug, and Cosmetic Act (FDCA) and other related Acts 
 Title 21, United States Code, and related acts
Federal Anti-Tampering Act (FATA)
 Title 18, United States Code § 1365

FDA-OCI Agents have restricted arrest authority in comparison to most other federal agents. 
Pursuant to 21 U.S. Code § 372 (e)(4) arrests without a warrant made by OCI Agents must be related to Title 21.

Violations
Since 1993, OCI has investigated thousands of criminal schemes involving the distribution of potentially dangerous FDA-regulated products. These investigations have involved a wide variety of criminal conduct, including street level distribution of counterfeit, unapproved, and designer drugs, major organized illicit diversion of prescription drugs, fraudulent schemes involving ineffective AIDS, cancer, and Alzheimer cures, large scale product substitution conspiracies, application and clinical investigator fraud, and health frauds involving harmful FDA-regulated drugs and medical devices.

As FDA's criminal law enforcement arm, OCI protects the American public by conducting criminal investigations of illegal activities involving FDA-regulated products, arresting those responsible, and bringing them before the Department of Justice for prosecution.

Special agents
The Office of Criminal Investigations' (OCI) experienced special agents employ a traditional law enforcement approach to the systematic collection of evidence necessary to ensure successful criminal prosecutions.  OCI provides its special agents with numerous resources to support investigations such as an experienced staff of investigative analysts, technical equipment specialist, polygraph examiners, and special agents trained in computer forensics. OCI Special Agents are dedicated to protecting the health and welfare of the public  by investigating criminal allegations falling within the jurisdiction of the U.S. Food and Drug Administration (FDA).

OCI Special Agents are hired from a variety of federal law enforcement agencies, such as the U.S. Drug Enforcement Administration, Immigration and Customs Enforcement, the U.S. Secret Service, the U.S. Postal Inspection Service, the Federal Bureau of Investigation, the Bureau of Alcohol, Tobacco, Firearms and Explosives, and the Internal Revenue Service Criminal Investigations.

Powers and authority
Special agents have the federal statutory authority and capabilities to obtain and execute arrest and search warrants, carry firearms, and gather evidence to enforce the United States criminal law. They continue to receive instruction in areas designed to enhance job performance and promote career development. These areas include the FDA Food and Drug Law course, interviewing techniques, financial crimes, computer forensics, asset forfeiture, continuing legal education, Internet investigations, and management and leadership training.

As previously stated, reports have surfaced via Reuters news agency of certain agents engaging in threatening and aggressive behavior. One such incident occurred in April 2012 in Greeneville, Tennessee, when an OCI Special Agent raided an oncology clinic without a warrant and was unknowingly caught on a security camera making threatening remarks to one of the clinic's employees.

Case activity

Examples of the types of criminal investigations OCI investigates.
 
Counterfeit drugs: Beginning in 2005, an OCI counterfeit drug investigation has resulted in the indictment of three businesses and 24 individuals for their involvement in a $42 million conspiracy to manufacture and sell counterfeit, Lipitor and other drugs which they manufactured in a Costa Rican lab. To date 17 have been convicted.
 Health Care Fraud: OCI, working with several other agencies, uncovered a massive conspiracy to overcharge Medicare, Medicaid and other providers for a drug for prostate cancer. The company paid more than $291 million in fines and restitution to U.S. and state governments.
 Illegal schemes for Serostim: After OCI's Special Agents discovered a conspiracy to commit health care fraud by bribing doctors and using other illegal methods to market a treatment for AIDS, the company paid $704 million in criminal fines and restitution to the U.S. Treasury.
 Misbranded Drugs: On April 12, 2006, two men were sentenced in the Southern District of Indiana Federal Court to 77 months' incarceration after pleading guilty to introducing a misbranded drug into interstate commerce. Dextromethorphan (DXM), a cough suppressant, was sold over the internet through their Web site. This case started in 2005 when five young people died after ordering and consuming DXM from the website.
 Clinical investigator fraud: An investigation by OCI and the Veterans Affairs (VA) Office of Inspector General resulted in the conviction of a VA physician who falsified documentation of a clinical drug study and recklessly enrolled patients who did not qualify under the study protocol. The physician's criminal negligence caused the death of one patient by falsely documenting the results of blood chemistry analysis. The physician was prosecuted and sentenced to 71 months' federal incarceration.
Food Contamination/Poisoning: The president of a cold storage distribution company was convicted and sentenced to one year of federal incarceration. The company paid hundreds of thousands of dollars in restitution for re-boxing and relabeling food tainted by an ammonia leak at the cold storage facility. The contaminated food was delivered to an Illinois elementary school, causing approximately 43 students and staff to become hospitalized.
 Illegal promotion for OxyContin: A major pharmaceutical company and three executives were convicted for having falsely labeled, promoted, and illegally marketed a potent pain reliever. The company paid fines and restitution totaling more than $600 million.
Illegal drug diversion: In 2006, father-and-son owners and operators of a Florida pharmaceutical wholesale distributorship were sentenced to 18 years' and 25 years' incarceration, respectively. They also paid more than $27 million in restitution for their involvement in an illicit diversion scheme to buy and sell millions of dollars of illegally obtained medications used to treat AIDS, cancer, hemophilia, and other ailments. This scheme defrauded the Medicaid and Medicare programs of more than $45,000,000.
 Faulty surgical devices: OCI agents were instrumental in securing the conviction of two company executives who had fraudulently sold surgical sterilizing devices that caused eye damage in 18 patients, one of whom lost sight in one eye.
 Unlicensed flu vaccine: In 2005, OCI agents arrested a person in Texas who administered counterfeit influenza vaccine. Agents also brought about a federal conviction of a smuggler who tried to sell the foreign, unlicensed flu vaccine to hospitals.

See also

Federal law enforcement in the United States
Drug Enforcement Administration

References

External links
 Official website
 Press Releases
 Cargo Theft
 The FDA, but with guns: How far should a little-known office go to track down counterfeit drugs? (STAT News profile)

Federal law enforcement agencies of the United States
Food and Drug Administration